The 1954–55 Danish Cup was the 1st installment of the Danish Cup, the highest football competition in Denmark.

Final

References

1954-55
1954–55 domestic association football cups
1954–55 in Danish football